Futou (also pronounced and written as ), also known as  and , was one of the most important form of Chinese headwear in ancient China with a history of more than one-thousand years. The  first appeared in Northern Zhou under the reign of Emperor Wu where it became prevalent. It was also commonly worn in the Tang and Song dynasties. The  was typically worn by government officials. The  was originally a turban-like headwear which was tied at the back of its wearer's head, the two corners would go to the opposite directions thus acting as decorations. The  eventually came to assume a variety of shapes and styles.

The  was also introduced in both Unified Silla and Balhae and continued to be worn by government officials until the late Joseon.

Terminology 
The term  (or ) means "head scarf" or "head-cloth".

History

Origins 

According to Chinese scholar Sun Ji in the 《從幞頭到頭巾》, the  first appeared in the 3rd century AD and was based on the headdress of a northern tribe.

Guzel Maitdinova proposed in 1990 that  may have been developed from hats worn in ancient Central Asia and was brought in by the Turks from Sogdiana to Tokharistan to China by basing herself on information provided by Hsen Kuo (an 11th century Chinese annalist):

Wei, Jin, Northern and Southern dynasties 

The  first appeared a type of kerchief made by cutting a piece of muslin fabric into the proper size and by attaching four long and wide ribbons at each corner of the fabric like four feet. This  was large enough to cover all the hair of its wearer, and when it was worn, a kerchief had to be placed on the top of its wearer's head. Two of these ribbons were tied on the forehead while the other two were tied at the back of the wearer's head and was left hanging down.

Sui, Tang dynasty, and Five dynasties and ten kingdoms period

Tang dynasty 
The  was made with soft and light tung wood and with other materials such as bamboo strip, timbo, miscanthus, silk, and leather. Moreover, by adding wire or silk strings inside the added ribbons, the futou could take different shapes and styles depending on its wearer's liking. However, in the Tang dynasty, only the Emperors could use these hard ribbons; these hard ribbons would be bent upward.

Five dynasties and ten kingdoms period 

Ma Xifan also wore the horns of a dragon, a futou with extremely long feet on both sides. 

It is also attested in the Song Shi that the  had become straight and flat since the Five dynasties period.

Song dynasty 
The  was popular in the Song dynasty, and it was commonly worn all classes of people ranging from commoners to emperors wore . The  could also be found with supports made out of wood, and therefore they could look like hats and caps of various styles.

According to the Pedantic Remarks of the Confucians by Yu Yan, this form of  might have been developed to prevent the officials from whispering to each other during court audience with the Emperor. On some special occasions (e.g. the imperial court banquets, or the longevity ceremonies held for the royal family), Song court officials would put flowers on their ; this was referred as Flower pinning. The Song emperors would sometimes send fresh flowers or man-made flowers which were exclusive to the use of the imperial court to his courtier; this later become a form of etiquette in the Song dynasty court.It is also recorded in the Song Shi that the upward  was used by people (including the Emperor and the officials) when they found themselves in narrow spaces, such as in a carriage.

According to the first volume of the History Narrated at Ease in the section The Etiquette by Wang Dechen (1036 –1116), in the early Song dynasty, a type , called front-folded scarf, was worn by some people. The front-folded scarf was folded and tied at the front region of the head was worn by some people. The back-folded scarf was a type  which would be bent backward; it started to be worn after the Shaosheng period (i.e. after 1098 AD).

Liao dynasty 

In the Khitan-led Liao dynasty, the Khitans shaved their hair in a style called kunfa and wore light hats made of felt or helmets which were more suitable for their horse riding activities instead of wearing the lacquered futou; however the futou did not disappear in this period and continued to be depicted in the Liao dynasty tomb murals, including the curved leg futou.

Yuan dynasty 

In the Mongol-led Yuan dynasty, the futou continued to be worn since the Yuan dynasty court followed the Song dynasty standards regarding official costumes:

Ming dynasty 
The Ming dynasty kept the tradition of using straight-feet futou; however, by the shape of the futou worn in the Ming dynasty diverted from that worn in the Song dynasty: the feet became shorter with time and some of these futou became less than forty-centimetres. The forty-centimetres long straight-feet, painted linen futou was worn by the both the military and civil officials for official business according to the Ming Shi. The feet of the Ming dynasty straight-feet futou were not completely straight and had a curved tip-end which would bend upwards.

Derivative and influences

See also
Hanfu
Hanfu headgear
Qing official headwear
List of hats and headgear

Notes

References

External links 

Chinese headgear
headwear